The Paramedic is a 2020 Spanish psychological thriller film directed by , written by David Desola and Hèctor Hernández Vicens and starring Mario Casas and Déborah François.

The Paramedic was released on September 16, 2020 by Netflix.

Plot 
Ángel Hernández is a paramedic who lives with his girlfriend Vanesa (Vane) François. Ángel has an unempathetic attitude towards his patients and steals from them, selling the more valuable items to a local fence. At home, he is possessive and controlling towards Vane. The couple are trying for a baby without success. Ángel tells Vane it's her fault and even suggest her inability to get pregnant is psychosomatic. He then takes a fertility test and discovers that he has a low sperm count, but does not tell Vane.

One day, while taking an injured patient to hospital, the ambulance (driven by his colleague Ricardo) is in an accident and Ángel is left paralysed from the waist down and uses a wheelchair. He blames Ricardo and is unable to forgive him. His disability puts a strain on his relationship with Vane, and he becomes increasingly more paranoid that she is cheating on him. He seems to enjoy berating, mocking, and gaslighting her. Vane works at a call centre at night, and Ángel installs spyware on her phone to keep tabs on her.

Via the phone spyware, he overhears a conversation between Vane and her friend, who tells her that Ángel is abusive and that Vane should leave him. When Vane returns home that day, Ángel has cooked her favourite meal and is contrite about the way he has treated her. They try to have sex but do not succeed because Ángel is unable to feel anything. While he is showering, Vane discovers from his laptop that he has been spying on her. Disgusted, she packs up and leaves for good.

Several months pass, but Ángel is still obsessed with Vane.  He stalks her and eventually sees her kissing Ricardo, with whom she has begun a relationship. Later, Ángel observes the couple shopping for baby things and realises that she is pregnant with Ricardo's baby. Ángel meets Vane in the street and tells her that he has boxed up her remaining possessions and asks if she would like to come and pick them up. However, on their arrival at the apartment, Ángel injects Vane, causing her to lose consciousness. When she awakes, she finds herself gagged and tied to a bed. Ángel uses Vane's phone to send Ricardo a message, telling him that she does not want to have their baby, and asking him not to contact her. Ricardo later approaches Ángel to say he does not believe Vane sent the message and is worried because he can't find her.

Ángel injects Vane with an epidural so that she temporarily loses the use of her legs. He presents her with a engagement ring (actually stolen from one of his former patients) and talks of their future together raising their (Vane's) baby. Vane makes an escape attempt but he overcomes her. His elderly neighbour hears Vane scream and comes to investigate. When the old man threatens to call the police, Ángel stabs him to death, and pays his friend the fence to dispose of the body. Ángel also goes over to Ricardo's house and kills him.

A few days later, police arrive at Ángel's apartment and advise him that they are investigating Ricardo's death, and the disappearance of Vane (whom Ricardo had reported as a missing person). Ángel manages to satisfy the police that he knows nothing about either.

Vane manages to escape while Ángel is out of the apartment. Although with only partial use of her legs,  she succeeds in dragging herself down the staircase of the building, but when the lift stops on the landing, Ángel exits. They struggle, but Vane stabs him with a screwdriver and he falls several flights down the stairwell.

In the final scene, Ángel is in hospital, now completely paralysed, unable to talk and breathing through a tube in his throat. Vane appears, fully recovered and visibly pregnant. She tells the helpless Ángel that from now on she will be taking care of him. His fate is left unknown as Vane wheels him out of the hospital with a sinister smile on her face.

Cast

Production 
The film is a Babieka Entertainment and Zabriskie Films production. Shooting locations in Catalonia included Lleida.

Release 
The Paramedic was released on September 16, 2020 by Netflix.

Reception 
Rubén Romero Santos of Cinemanía rated the film 3½ out of 5 stars, rallying laggards to join the Mario Casas bandwagon, highlighting the transformation experienced by the actor from Three Steps Above Heaven to The Paramedic, in which he plays a "wheelchair-bound inhuman sociopathic demon".

Raquel Hernández Luján of HobbyConsolas rated the film with 80 points ('very good'), deeming it to be "a very successful film with strong performances and a great ending", also praising Casas' acting transformation, while warning that the film is not precisely reinventing the wheel.

See also 
 List of Spanish films of 2010

References

External links
 
 

2020 films
2020s Spanish-language films
Spanish-language Netflix original films
Spanish psychological thriller films
2020 psychological thriller films
Films directed by Carles Torras
Films set in 2019
Films set in 2020
Films set around New Year
2020s Spanish films
Films shot in the province of Lleida